Mobarakeh (also Romanized as Mobārakeh) is a village in Efzar Rural District, Efzar District, Qir and Karzin County, Fars Province, Iran. At the 2006 census, its population was 32, in 6 families.

References 

Populated places in Qir and Karzin County